Richard Skalak (February 5, 1923 – August 17, 1997) was an American pioneer in biomedical engineering. He is known for his groundbreaking work in the mechanics of blood flow, bone growth, white blood cell response to infections, and biological implications and responses to implants. He won numerous significant scientific honors over his career, including election to the National Academy of Engineering in 1988. He is the namesake of the ASME Richard Skalak Award.

Awards and honors
Chair Applied Mechanics Division, 1979
Theodore von Karman Medal, 1987
National Academy of Engineering, 1988
Ted Belytschko Applied Mechanics Award, 1997
Poiseuille Medal of the International Society of Biorheology
Fellow, American Society of Mechanical Engineers
Fellow, American Academy of Mechanics
Fellow, American Society of Civil Engineers
Fellow, New York Academy of Medicine
Fellow, American Association for the Advancement of Science

References

1923 births
1997 deaths
American bioengineers
American Presbyterians
Members of the United States National Academy of Engineering
Columbia School of Engineering and Applied Science alumni
Columbia School of Engineering and Applied Science faculty
20th-century American engineers